The XI International Chopin Piano Competition was held from 30 September to 20 October 1985 in Warsaw.

For the first time, participants could choose to play on a Kawai or on a Yamaha piano, in addition to the Steinway and Bösendorfer that had been available before. Bechstein withdrew from the competition after its instrument was chosen just once during the 9th competition.

Awards 
The competition consisted of three stages and a final.

The following prizes were awarded:

Three special prizes were awarded:

Jury 
The jury consisted of: 
  Edward Auer
  Halina Czerny-Stefańska ( IV)
  Jan Ekier (chairman)
  Konstantin Ganew
  Valentin Gheorghiu
  Lidia Grychtołówna
  Barbara Hesse-Bukowska ( IV)
  Andrzej Jasiński
  Karl-Heinz Kämmerling
  Victor Merzhanov (vice-chairman)
  Piotr Paleczny
  
  Frantisek Rauch
  Bernard Ringeissen
  Takahiro Sonoda
   (vice-chairman)
  Fou Ts'ong ( V)
  Charles H. Webb
  Lev Vlassenko
  Tadeusz Żmudziński

Guido Agosti and Arthur Moreira Lima resigned just before the competition.

Fou Ts'ong protested against the awarding of First Prize to Stanislav Bunin by not turning up for the jury's last session and refusing to sign the verdict.

References

Further reading

External links 
 

 

International Chopin Piano Competition
1985 in music
1985 in Poland
1980s in Warsaw
October 1985 events in Europe